Rafael Ortega may refer to:

 Rafael Ortega (boxer) (born 1950), Panamanian boxer
 Rafael Ortega (baseball) (born 1991), Venezuelan baseball outfielder 
 Rafael Ortega (weightlifter) (born 1953), Dominican Republic weightlifter
 Rafael Ortega (tennis), Mexican tennis player